This is a list of Archaeological Protected Monuments in Kilinochchi District, Sri Lanka.

Notes

References

External links
 Department of Archaeology - Sri Lanka
 Ministry of Culture and the Arts

 
Archaeological